Smita (born Smita Vallurupalli on 4 September 1980) is an Indian pop singer, playback singer and actress known for her works in Tollywood, Telugu Music Industry, Bollywood, Kollywood and Kannada cinema. She has appeared in films such as Malliswari (2004) and Aata (2007) as well as short film Dying To Be Me (2015).

Career

Singing
Smita's potential as a singer was identified at a talent show Padutha Theeyaga on Telugu television channel ETV anchored by S. P. Balasubrahmanyam in 1997. Around this time she started trying for some playback opportunities and she did get to sing a few playback songs. Her parents advised her that it was more apt to choose pop singing as a career as she had a style which is more suited for making of a pop artist. Hairabba was a result of this decision.

Cinema and Pop
Her career as a pop artist started in the year 2000 with the launch of her first album "Hai Rabba". This album was followed by several blockbuster albums in Telugu and Tamil. Some of her albums in Telugu club mix have crossed sales of over one million copies with special mention to albums like "Masaka Masaka". Over the last seven years Smita has sung over seventy five playback songs in Telugu and has worked with leading music composers from the south.

The song "Evaraina chusuntara" from the film "Anukokunda oka roju" composed by M.M.Keeravani won her a Filmfare award as best playback singer in Telugu films for the year 2005. Many albums followed and became blockbusters. She created a market for Pop music in Andhra Pradesh and Tamil Nadu and kept the Pop music alive for almost a decade now.

The recently launched album "SMITA" has nine tracks and the music has been composed by the hit duo – Sajid Wajid (of Partner & Welcome fame) and video directed and choreographed by the country's leading choreographers Bosco-Caesar. It has been released in Hindi and Tamil by the leading music company Sony BMG. The pop album is available in stores from 7 May.

In "SMITA", racy dance numbers like the first video single "Mahi Ve" which was shot on a huge set where multiple set-ups including a 20 feet wide 'lotus pool' was constructed as a part of the set, in which Smita was seated and completed in a matter of only 2 days with a troupe of 8 professional British dancers. This will be followed shortly by the second video 'Aaja Nachle', which is a hip-hopish dance number. The album also includes seductive and mischievous tracks like "Ouch" to the soothing romantic ballads "Zara Zara" and "Saawariya", followed by "Dholna" which showcases Smita's dexterity across genres and emotions.

Smita's Pop Album "Mahi ve" Titled as "Maayavi" in Tamil is wide popular in Tamil Nadu as it has been a huge hit in Tamil Nadu.

Other works
ICandy Entertainments Pvt Ltd is a new addition to her business. This is a production house started by her recently. This company is currently producing a popular show 'Tata Indicom-Dance With Me' for Maa TV. It is currently Striked off in 2014.

Ishana 
Smita has released her new album Ishana – the path of the divine on 29 February, at a media event in Hyderabad. An Isha volunteer for the past three years, Smita made the album as an offering to Sadhguru and Isha Foundation. Created for a cause, the entire proceeds from the sale of the album will go to support Isha Foundation's work in the areas of education, environment and rural initiatives.

Along with the album, two videos were also launched during the meet. The album has six audio songs and two videos that were shot at the Isha Yoga Center, primarily at the Dhyanalinga and Linga Bhairavi temples. Music for the album was composed by Nihal and the videos were directed by acclaimed cinematographer Sameer Reddy and top photographer Tarun Khiwal. Film personalities M.M Keeravani and Brahmanandam attended the music launch, while the video launch featured cinema figures S.S. Rajamouli, Krish and Siddharth.

References

External links 

1980 births
Living people
Indian women playback singers
Indian film actresses
Singers from Andhra Pradesh
Indian women pop singers
21st-century Indian singers
Musicians from Vijayawada
Telugu playback singers
21st-century Indian women singers
Women musicians from Andhra Pradesh
Actresses from Vijayawada
21st-century Indian actresses
Actresses in Telugu cinema